The European Institute of Education (eie) is a government licensed institute of higher education in Valletta, Malta.

The institute was established in 2000. Student recruitment offices operate in various European and Asian cities. It provides Malta Government Scholarship Scheme to its Students.

eie conducts various courses in business and management at academic level and also executive courses (executive education).

A collaboration agreement has been signed between the European Institute of Education and the Young Entrepreneurs and Leaders Organisation (YEL).

References 

Schools in Malta